The comparison of the performances of all of the clubs that participated in UEFA Europa League in its current format (2009–present) is below. The qualification rounds were not taken into account.

Clubs transferred from UEFA Champions League marked in italics.

Classification

Performance

UEFA Cup performance (2004–09)

See also
UEFA Europa League
UEFA Cup and Europa League records and statistics
UEFA Champions League clubs performance comparison
UEFA Europa Conference League clubs performance comparison

Notes

UEFA Europa League records and statistics
Association football comparisons